A list of notable economists from Slovenia:

B 
 Andrej Bajuk
 Milko Brezigar

D 
 Janez Drnovšek

G 
 Mitja Gaspari

M 
 Jože Mencinger

P 
 Janez Potočnik

R 
 Dušan Radonjič
 Anton Rop

S 
 Ljubo Sirc

 
Economist
Slovenian